Zee One is an English and Bollywood channel in South Africa that was launched on November 1, 2021. It is a sister network to Zee World, and like that network, it carries domestic programming from India dubbed from Hindi and Marathi and other languages into English. The channel is owned by Zee Entertainment Enterprises and it has offices in Johannesburg.

The network mainly carries a diverse offering of programs from the 2000s and 2010s from Zee TV's domestic subcontinent networks.

References

Hindi cinema
Television channels and stations established in 2021
Television stations in South Africa
Zee Entertainment Enterprises